Johannes Gezelius the younger (6 September 1647–10 April 1718), also known as Johannes Gezelius den yngre in Swedish and Johannes Gezelius nuorempi in Finnish, was a theologian, professor at the Royal Academy of Åbo and Bishop of Turku between 1690 and 1718.

Biography
Gezelius was the son of Bishop Johannes Gezelius the elder and Gertrud Gutheim. His own son, Johannes Gezelius the youngest, was bishop of Porvoo. In 1670 Gezelius left to study in Germany, England and France against his father's wishes. He studied in Oxford under the direction of Edward Pococke. In 1674 he returned to Turku and defended his doctorate in 1675, after which he was appointed a theology professor at the Royal Academy of Turku. 

Between 1684 and 1688 he was the Superintendent of Livonia. Upon his father's death in 1690, he was appointed his successor in Turku. During his time as Bishop of Turlku, Gezelius published a hymnal that had been edited by Erik Cajanus. It was later commonly called the Old Hymnal and was based on a Swedish hymnal from 1695.

See also
List of bishops of Turku

References

External links

Christian hymnwriters
1647 births
1718 deaths
Lutheran archbishops and bishops of Turku